The terms pre-cell, proto-cell, progenote, last universal common ancestor (LUCA) etc. are used to designate the hypothetical ancestral entity of first life on earth. The meanings of these terms as well as the concepts of this ancestral entity (a single precursor cell, a precursor stage, or a precursor population), are quite different under the different hypotheses, theories and, accordingly, in corresponding publications.

The origin, early evolution and diversification of life as well as the development of first cells (cellularisation) remain fundamental questions.

Under the RNA world hypothesis all cells have descended from a common ancestral cell, the last universal common ancestor (LUCA). 

This ancestral cell (sometimes also called pre-cell oder proto-cell) is thought to have been the root of the three domains of life. It is a hypothetical lipid-based structure that could have confined RNA in ancient times. This structure allowed the RNA to remain in close proximity with other RNA molecules, keeping them concentrated and allowing for an increased reaction rate of enzymes. It would have had semi-permeable membranes, allowing only certain molecules to pass through. These enclosed structures may have facilitated natural selection in RNA molecules.

Under the Iron-Sulfur world hypothesis primordial forms of life and metabolism allowed diversification through the development of a multiphenotypical population of pre-cells (Kandler 1994, 1995, 1998), i.e. metabolising, replicating loose entities of primeval life exhibiting many of the basic properties of a cell but no proper cytoplasmic membrane and no stable chromosome, thus allowing frequent mutual exchange of genetic information. 

From this pre-cell population the founder groups A, B, C and then, from them, the precursor cells (here named proto-cells) of the three domains of life emerged successively, leading first to the domain Bacteria, then to the domain Archea and finally to the domain Eucarya. 

Thus, under this scenario there was no ancestral “first cell“. Instead, the development of cells (cellularisation) was a process of successive evolutionary improvement.

This scenario may explain the quasi-random distribution of evolutionarily important features among the three domains and, at the same time, the existence of the most basic biochemical features (genetic code, set of protein amino acids etc.) in all three domains (unity of life), as well as the close relationship between the Archaea and the Eucarya. Kandler’s pre-cell theory is supported by Wächtershäuser. 

A scheme of the pre-cell scenario is presented in the adjacent figure, where essential evolutionary improvements are indicated by numbers.

For more theories on the formation of cells see main article History of life (examples under chapter “Replication first”).

Structure
Pre-cells are thought to have had a membrane composed of mixed-enantiomer lipid molecules. As natural selection proceeded, pre-cells may have developed stereospecific lipid membranes through frequent fission and fusion of racemic pre-cells.

References

RNA